West Virginia Route 20 is a major north–south state highway in the U.S. state of West Virginia. The southern terminus of the route is at U.S. Route 52 in Bluewell, a small unincorporated suburb of Bluefield. The northern terminus is at West Virginia Route 7 three miles (5 km) east of New Martinsville. WV Route 20 is the longest state route in West Virginia.

Attractions
Concord University, Athens
Pipestem Resort State Park, Pipestem
Bluestone State Park, Summers County
Bluestone Lake, Summers County
Sandstone Falls, New River Gorge National Park and Preserve, north of Hinton
Holly River State Park, Webster County

Major intersections

References

020
West Virginia Route 020
West Virginia Route 020
West Virginia Route 020
West Virginia Route 020
West Virginia Route 020
West Virginia Route 020
West Virginia Route 020
West Virginia Route 020
West Virginia Route 020
West Virginia Route 020